Ron Ehli (born December 7, 1956) is an American politician. He served as a Republican member of the Montana House of Representatives.

References

1956 births
21st-century American politicians
Living people
Republican Party members of the Montana House of Representatives
Montana State University alumni
People from McCone County, Montana